Below is a list of the 25 members of the European Parliament for the Netherlands in the 1979 to 1984 session.

Party representation

Mutations

1979 
 7 June: Election for the European Parliament in the Netherlands.
 17 July: Begin 1st European Parliament session. (1979-1984)
 22 November: Anne Vondeling (PvdA) dies after a traffic accident.
 29 November: Phili Viehoff (PvdA) is installed in the European Parliament as a replacement for Anne Vondeling.

1981 
 10 June: Suzanne Dekker (D66) leaves the European Parliament, taking her seat in the Dutch Parliament after the 1981 Dutch general election.
 19 June: Doeke Eisma (D66) is installed in the European Parliament as a replacement for Suzanne Dekker.

1982 
 1 January: Frans van der Gun (CDA) leaves the European Parliament.
 15 February: Joep Mommersteeg (CDA) is installed in the European Parliament as a replacement for Frans van der Gun.

List

| style="text-align:left;" colspan="11" | 
|-
! Name
! Sex
! National party
! EP Group
! Period
! Preference vote
|-align=left
| Wim Albers
| Male
|  Labour Party
|  SOC
| 17 July 1979 – 24 July 1984
|
|-align=left
| Cees Berkhouwer
| Male
|  People's Party for Freedom and Democracy
|  LD
| 17 July 1979 – 24 July 1984
|
|-align=left
| Bouke Beumer
| Male
|  Christian Democratic Appeal
|  EPP
| 17 July 1979 – 19 July 1994
|
|-align=left
| Elise Boot
| Female
|  Christian Democratic Appeal
|  EPP
| 17 July 1979 – 24 July 1989
|
|-align=left
| Bob Cohen
| Male
|  Labour Party
|  SOC
| 17 July 1979 – 24 July 1989
|
|-align=left
| Piet Dankert
| Male
|  Labour Party
|  SOC
| 17 July 1979 – 7 November 1989
|
|-align=left
| Suzanne Dekker
| Female
|  Democrats 66
|  NI
| 17 July 1979 – 10 June 1981
|
|-align=left
| Doeke Eisma
| Male
|  Democrats 66
|  NI
| 19 June 1981 – 23 July 1984
|
|-align=left
| Aart Geurtsen
| Male
|  People's Party for Freedom and Democracy
|  LD
| 17 July 1979 – July 1984
|
|-align=left
| Aar de Goede
| Male
|  Democrats 66
|  NI
| 17 July 1979 – 24 July 1984
|
|-align=left
| Frans van der Gun
| Male
|  Christian Democratic Appeal
|  EPP
| 17 July 1979 – 1 January 1982
|
|-align=left
| Ien van den Heuvel-de Blank
| Female
|  Labour Party
|  SOC
| 17 July 1979 – 24 July 1989
|
|-align=left
| Sjouke Jonker
| Male
|  Christian Democratic Appeal
|  EPP
| 17 July 1979 – 24 July 1984
|
|-align=left
| Annie Krouwel-Vlam
| Female
|  Labour Party
|  SOC
| 17 July 1979 – 23 July 1984
|
|-align=left
| Hendrik Jan Louwes
| Male
|  People's Party for Freedom and Democracy
|  LD
| 17 July 1979 – 24 July 1989
|
|-align=left
| Hanja Maij-Weggen
| Female
|  Christian Democratic Appeal
|  EPP
| 17 July 1979 – 6 November 1989
|
|-align=left
| Johan van Minnen
| Male
|  Labour Party
|  SOC
| 17 July 1979 – 24 July 1984
|
|-align=left
| Joep Mommersteeg
| Male
|  Christian Democratic Appeal
|  EPP
| 15 February 1982 – 24 July 1984
|
|-align=left
| Hemmo Muntingh
| Male
|  Labour Party
|  SOC
| 17 July 1979 – 19 July 1994
|
|-align=left
| Hans Nord
| Male
|  People's Party for Freedom and Democracy
|  LD
| 17 July 1979 – 24 July 1989
|
|-align=left
| Harry Notenboom
| Male
|  Christian Democratic Appeal
|  EPP
| 17 July 1979 – July 1984
|
|-align=left
| Jean Penders
| Male
|  Christian Democratic Appeal
|  EPP
| 17 July 1979 – 19 July 1994
|
|-align=left
| Jim Janssen van Raaij
| Male
|  Christian Democratic Appeal
|  EPP
| 17 July 1979 – 24 July 1984October 1986 – 20 July 1999
| 
|-align=left
| Teun Tolman
| Male
|  Christian Democratic Appeal
|  EPP
| 17 July 1979 – 24 July 1989
|
|-align=left
| Wim Vergeer
| Male
|  Christian Democratic Appeal
|  EPP
| 17 July 1979 – 24 July 1989
|
|-align=left
| Phili Viehoff
| Female
|  Labour Party
|  SOC
| December 1979 – 24 July 1989
|
|-align=left
| Anne Vondeling
| Male
|  Labour Party
|  SOC
| 17 July 1979 – 22 November 1979
|
|-align=left
| Eisso Woltjer
| Male
|  Labour Party
|  SOC
| 17 July 1979 – 19 July 1994
|
|-style="background-color:#dcdcdc"
|align=left colspan="6"|Source:
|-
|}

By party

On the Christian Democratic Appeal list: (EPP)

 Bouke Beumer (top candidate)
 Elise Boot
 Frans van der Gun (replaced by: Joep Mommersteeg)
 Jim Janssen van Raaij
 Sjouke Jonker
 Hanja Maij-Weggen
 Harry Notenboom
 Jean Penders
 Teun Tolman
 Wim Vergeer
 Joep Mommersteeg

On the Labour Party list: (SOC)

 Wim Albers
 Bob Cohen
 Piet Dankert
 Annie Krouwel-Vlam
 Johan van Minnen
 Hemmo Muntingh
 Anne Vondeling (top candidate) (replaced by: Phili Viehoff)
 Eisso Woltjer
 Ien van den Heuvel-de Blank
 Phili Viehoff

On the People's Party for Freedom and Democracy list: (LD)

 Cees Berkhouwer (top candidate)
 Aart Geurtsen
 Hendrik Jan Louwes
 Hans Nord

On the Democrats 66 list: (NI)

 Aar de Goede (top candidate)
 Suzanne Dekker (replaced by: Doeke Eisma)
 Doeke Eisma

References

Netherlands
List
1979